The International Classification of Functioning, Disability and Health (ICF) is a classification of the health components of functioning and disability.

The ICF received approval from all 191 World Health Organization (WHO) member states on May 22, 2001, during the 54th World Health Assembly. Its approval followed nine years of international revision efforts coordinated by WHO. WHO's initial classification for the effects of diseases, the International Classification of Impairments, Disabilities, and Handicaps (ICIDH), was created in 1980.

The ICF classification complements WHO's International Classification of Diseases-10th Revision (ICD), which contains information on diagnosis and health condition, but not on functional status. The ICD and ICF constitute the core classifications in the WHO Family of International Classifications (WHO-FIC).

Overview
The ICF is structured around the following broad components:

 Body functions and structure
 Activities (related to tasks and actions by an individual) and participation (involvement in a life situation)
 Additional information on severity and environmental factors

Functioning and disability are viewed as a complex interaction between the health condition of the individual and the contextual factors of the environment as well as personal factors. The picture produced by this combination of factors and dimensions is of "the person in his or her world". The classification treats these dimensions as interactive and dynamic rather than linear or static. It allows for an assessment of the degree of disability, although it is not a measurement instrument. It is applicable to all people, whatever their health condition. The language of the ICF is neutral as to etiology, placing the emphasis on function rather than condition or disease. It also is carefully designed to be relevant across cultures as well as age groups and genders, making it highly appropriate for heterogeneous populations.

Benefits 
There are benefits of using the ICF for both the patient and the health professional. A major advantage for the patient is the integration of the physical, mental, and social aspects of his or her health condition. All aspects of a person's life (development, participation and environment) are incorporated into the ICF instead of solely focusing on his or her diagnosis. A diagnosis reveals little about one's functional abilities. Diagnoses are important for defining the cause and prognosis, but identifying the limitations of function is often the information used to plan and implement interventions. Once a rehabilitation team is aware of the daily activities a client is required to participate in, the problem solving sequence set up by the ICF can be utilized. An occupational therapist, for example, would observe a patient performing his or her daily activities and note the patient's functional abilities. This information would then be used to determine the extent to which the individual's abilities can be improved through therapy and to what extent the environment can be changed to facilitate the individual's performance. Intervention at one level (current abilities) has the potential to prevent or modify events at a succeeding level (participation). For example, teaching a deaf child manual signs will foster effective interaction and increase one's participation with his or her family.

Rehabilitation therapists will be empowered with the ICF not only in their daily work with their patients, but also when working with other medical disciplines; hospitals and other health care administrations; health authorities and policy makers. All items are operationally defined with clear descriptions that can be applied to real life evaluations with clarity and ease. The language used in the ICF helps facilitate better communication between these groups of people.

Clinical relevance 
Knowing how a disease affects one's functioning enables better planning of services, treatment, and rehabilitation for persons with long-term disabilities or chronic conditions. The current ICF creates a more integrative understanding of health forming a comprehensive profile of an individual instead of focusing on one's disease, illness, or disability. The implications of using the ICF include an emphasis on the strengths of individuals, assisting individuals in participating more extensively in society by the use of interventions aimed at enhancing their abilities, and taking into consideration the environmental and personal factors that might hamper their participation.
Qualifiers: The ICF qualifiers “may be best translated clinically as the levels of functioning seen in a standardized or clinic setting and in everyday environments”. Qualifiers support standardization and the understanding of functioning in a multidisciplinary assessment. They enable all team members to quantify the extent of problems, even in areas of functioning where one is not a specialist. Without qualifiers codes have no inherent meaning. An impairment, limitation or restriction, is qualified from 0 (No problem; 0-4%), 1 (Mild problem: 5-24%), 2 (Moderate problem: 25-49%), 3 (Severe problem: 50-95%) to 4 (Complete problem: 96-100%). Environmental factors are quantified with a negative and positive scale denoting the extent to which the environment acts as a barrier or facilitator. For insurance purposes, the qualifiers can describe the effectiveness of treatment. One can interpret the decreasing of a qualifier score to be an increase in the functional ability of a patient.

Core sets 
An ICF Core Set can serve as a reference framework and a practical tool to classify and describe patient functioning in a more time efficient way. ICF Core Sets can be used along the continuum of care and over the course of a health condition. The ICF classification includes more than 1,400 categories limiting its use in clinical practice. It is time-consuming for a clinician to utilize the main volume of the ICF with his or her patients. Only a fraction of the categories is needed. As a general rule, 20% of the codes will explain 80% of the variance observed in practice. ICF Core Sets contain as few as possible, but as many ICF categories as necessary, to describe a patient's level of functioning. It is hypothesized that using an ICF Core Set will increase the inter-rater reliability when coding clinical cases as only the relevant categories for a particular patient will be utilized. Since all of the relevant categories are listed in an ICF Core Set, its use in multidisciplinary assessments protects health professionals from missing important aspects of functioning.

Pediatric use 
As clinicians and researchers used the ICF, they became more aware of its limitations. The ICF lacks the ability to classify the functional characteristics of a developing child. Different ICF codes are needed across the first years of a child's life to capture the growth and development of a disability even when the child's diagnosis does not change. The coding system can provide essential information about the severity of a health condition in terms of its impact on functioning. This can serve a significant role for providers caring for children with spectrum disorders such as autism or cerebral palsy. Children with these conditions may have the same diagnoses, but their abilities and levels of functioning widely vary across and within individuals over time.

The first draft of the International Classification of Functioning, Disability and Health for Children and Youth (ICF-CY) was completed in year 2003 and published in 2007. The ICF-CY was developed to be structurally consistent with the ICF for adults. A major difference between the ICF-CY and ICF is that the generic qualifiers from the adult ICF now include developmental aspects for children and youth in the ICF-CY. Descriptions of codes in the ICF-CY were revised and expanded and new content was added to previously unused codes. Codes were added to document characteristics as adaptability, responsivity, predictability, persistence, and approachability. “Sensing” and “exploration of objects” codes were expanded as well as the “importance of learning”. Since a child's main occupation is playing, it is also important to include more codes in this area. Different levels of play have separate codes in the ICF-CY (solitary, onlooker, parallel). This contrasts with the adult ICF as only one code existed in regards to leisure or recreation.

Changes in ICF-CY codes over time reflect developmental effects attributable to the child's interaction with the environment. Environmental factors influence functioning and development and can be documented as barriers or facilitators using the ICF-CY. The key environments of children and adolescents include their homes, day care centers, schools and recreation settings of playground, parks, and ball fields. Children will transition between different environments many times as they grow. For example, a child will transition into elementary or high school or from one service setting or agency to another. Attention to these transitions of children with disabilities has been identified as an important role for health care providers. A transition requires preparation and planning to find an appropriate and accommodating setting for a child's needs. With a coding system such as the ICF-CY, the transition will be smoother and interventions can start where the previous health provider left off.

See also 
 Social model of disability

References

Further reading

External links 
 
 
 
 
  The ICF and ICF-CY browsing tool of the Italian Collaborating Centre of the World Health Organization for the Family of International Classifications.

World Health Organization
Medical classification
Medical assessment and evaluation instruments